The Grammy Award for Best Pop Performance by a Duo or Group with Vocals was awarded between 1966 and 2011 (in its final year, it was awarded for recordings issued in 2010). The award had several minor name changes:

From 1966 to 1967, the award was known as Best Contemporary (R&R) Performance - Group (Vocal or Instrumental)
In 1968 it was awarded as Best Contemporary Group Performance (Vocal or Instrumental)
In 1969 it was awarded as Best Contemporary-Pop Performance - Vocal Duo or Group
In 1970 it was awarded as Best Contemporary Vocal Performance by a Group
In 1971 it was awarded as Best Contemporary Vocal Performance by a Duo, Group or Chorus
In 1972 it was awarded as Best Pop Vocal Performance by a Duo Or Group
From 1973 to 1977 it was awarded as Best Pop Vocal Performance by a Duo, Group or Chorus
In 1978 it was awarded as Best Pop Vocal Performance by a Group
In 1979 it was again awarded as Best Pop Vocal Performance by a Duo or Group
In 1980 it was again awarded as Best Pop Vocal Performance by a Duo, Group or Chorus
From 1981 to 2011 it was awarded as Best Pop Performance by a Duo or Group With Vocals

The award was discontinued from 2012 in a major overhaul of Grammy categories. From 2012, all duo or group performances in the pop field were shifted to the newly formed Best Pop Duo/Group Performance category.

A similar award for Best Performance by a Vocal Group was awarded from 1961 to 1968. This was also in the pop field, but did not specify pop music.

Years reflect the year in which the Grammy Awards were presented, for works released in the previous year.

Recipients

Category facts
Most wins:

 Most nominations

References

Awards established in 1966
Awards disestablished in 2011
Pop Performance by a Duo or Group with Vocals
Duo or Group with Vocals